Legend of the Dragon may refer to:

Legend of the Dragon (film), a 1990 Hong Kong film starring Stephen Chow
Legend of the Dragon (2005 film), a 2005 film starring Sammo Hung
Legend of the Dragon (TV series), a children's animated television program
Legend of the Dragon (video game), a 2007 video game based on the above show

See also
The Legend of Dragoon